Soundview is a neighborhood on the Clason Point peninsula, on the southern section of the borough of the Bronx in New York City. Its boundaries, starting from the north and moving clockwise, are the Cross-Bronx Expressway to the north, White Plains Road to the east, Lacombe Avenue to the south, and the Bronx River to the west. The Bruckner Expressway bisects the neighborhood horizontally along the center and the Bronx River Parkway runs north to south. Soundview Avenue is the primary thoroughfare through Soundview.

History

Most development initially concentrated near the IRT Pelham Line on Westchester Avenue and in close proximity to Soundview Avenue (once served by a streetcar). Prior to the late 20th century, large parcels across the neighborhood remained undeveloped. Some land in the neighborhood was used in 1947 for a temporary New York City Housing Authority (NYCHA) housing project made up of 947 apartments in 473 Quonset huts.  One remaining Quonset hut is still visible on the south side of Seward Avenue at Croes Avenue. In 1941 Clason Point Gardens was the first development constructed by the NYCHA in the Bronx. It was followed by many other NYCHA developments across the neighborhood from the 1950s until the 1970s, which boosted the population significantly. During the 1950s, two controlled-access highways, the Bronx River Parkway and Bruckner Expressway, were constructed. Later in the 1970s, large high-rise rental and co-op apartment complexes were constructed across the neighborhood following the establishment of the Mitchell Lama program.

Like neighboring Hunts Point, Soundview began to fall into rapid decay in the 1970s due to white flight, growing poverty rates, and a citywide fiscal crisis. Abandonment was a problem as the exodus picked up pace but much of the White non-Hispanic population was replaced by poor and working class Latin Americans and African Americans. As a result, abandonment was much less extensive than in neighborhoods to the west including Morrisania. The neighborhood was gravely affected by the crack epidemic throughout the late 1980s and early 1990s, setting yearly murder totals among the highest in the city. During that time, the Weed and Seed program was put into place by the federal government to improve the situation in Soundview, nearby Mott Haven, and East New York, Brooklyn and later Operation Impact. Policing methods include NYPD monitored CCTV along known high drug trafficking areas, increased foot presence, and improved statistical mapping.

In 1999, an unarmed man, Amadou Diallo, was shot and killed by four plainclothes officers near the corner of Wheeler and Westchester Avenues.

Starting in the 2000s, a citywide housing crisis spurred construction of modern multi-unit row houses and apartment buildings. Many are multi zoned for retail and have mixed-income qualifications. There are also plans to develop this type of housing on vacant land within the confines of NYCHA property along with significant renovations and improvements to existing grounds and buildings. Soundview Park, built on a former landfill and the largest in the South Bronx, has undergone a complete transformation including enhanced pedestrian access and completely renovated and redesigned recreational areas. Future plans in accordance with PlaNYC initiatives will create an urban oasis in this dense community; complete with recreation nodes, Greenway connections, bike/hike trails, designated fishing areas, a boat launch, and esplanades with skyline views. The neighborhood has become increasingly more diverse with a rise in varied Latin American and Asian immigration in recent years. Crime has also seen a significant decline as a result of a number of factors including enhanced policing techniques and changing economic demographics.

Demographics

Based on data from the 2010 United States Census, the combined population of the Soundview/Clason Point/Castle Hill/Harding Park tabulation area, which includes the southern half of the neighborhood, was 53,686 in 2010, a decrease of 2,933 (5.5%) from the 88,823 counted in 2000. The combined population of the Soundview/Bruckner tabulation area, which includes the northern half of the neighborhood, was 35,634 in 2010, an increase of 497 (1.4%) from the 35,137 counted in 2000. The racial makeup of these neighborhoods was 2% (1,067) White, 37% (19,876) African American, 0.3% (161) Native American, 1.3% (709) Asian, 0% (22) Pacific Islander, 0.4% (239) from other races, and 1.1% (586) from two or more races. Hispanic or Latino of any race were 57.8% (31,026) of the population.

Soundview's total land area is roughly 1.3 square miles. The neighborhood predominantly consists of Latin Americans (mainly Puerto Ricans) and African Americans.

The entirety of Community District 9, which comprises Soundview and Parkchester, had 184,105 inhabitants as of NYC Health's 2018 Community Health Profile, with an average life expectancy of 79.7 years. This is about the same as the median life expectancy of 81.2 for all New York City neighborhoods. Most inhabitants are youth and middle-aged adults: 25% are between the ages of between 0–17, 29% between 25–44, and 24% between 45–64. The ratio of college-aged and elderly residents was lower, at 10% and 12% respectively.

As of 2017, the median household income in Community District 9 was $40,005. In 2018, an estimated 26% of Soundview and Parkchester residents lived in poverty, compared to 25% in all of the Bronx and 20% in all of New York City. One in eight residents (13%) were unemployed, compared to 13% in the Bronx and 9% in New York City. Rent burden, or the percentage of residents who have difficulty paying their rent, is 55% in Soundview and Parkchester, compared to the boroughwide and citywide rates of 58% and 51% respectively. Based on this calculation,  Soundview and Parkchester are considered low-income relative to the rest of the city, and are not undergoing gentrification.

Land use and terrain

The land area contains a mix of uses but is primarily residential. Most of the population resides inside large residential complexes of various types. The neighborhood contains one of the highest concentrations of NYCHA projects in New York City. There is a mixture of pre-war architecture, mid-century, and modern buildings. Row-houses, semi-detached homes, detached homes, and apartment buildings are found throughout; the overwhelming majority containing multiple units.

The neighborhood's primary commercial corridors are White Plains Road, Soundview Avenue, and Westchester Avenue.

The central western border of the neighborhood, adjacent to the Bronx River, is primarily used for storage, warehousing, and automotive repair and modification. 

York Studios' Michelangelo Campus motion picture and television production facilities, is located at 1421 Story Avenue.

The studios for News 12 The Bronx are located at 930 Soundview Avenue.

The total land area is roughly 1.8 square miles. The terrain is mostly low lying and flat.

The Shops at Bruckner Commons
The Shops at Bruckner Commons, which greatly expanded throughout the 1990s and mostly renovated in 2018, divides Soundview from neighboring Castle Hill and contains some national chains like The Gap and Old Navy. Other primary thoroughfares contain amenities like supermarkets, pharmacies, barbershops, hair salons, fast food, bodegas, and cheap shops.

Parks and recreation

Soundview Park occupies  in the southwestern section of the neighborhood, with ballfields and playgrounds and a pedestrian/bike greenway along the left bank of the Bronx River estuary from Lafayette to Leland Avenue. It was built on filled land starting in 1939.  The first  of the park were acquired by the City of New York in 1937, and  more were acquired along the water's edge in December 1939.

"Parque de los Ninos", a playground at the corner of Morrison and Watson Avenues, opened in 1956 and was renamed in 1995 to honor six neighborhood children who were killed in the late 1980s. It was granted $1.6 million for renovations in 2016.

Low-income public housing complex
There are nine NYCHA developments located in Soundview.
 1471 Watson Avenue; one 6-story building.
 Boynton Avenue Rehab; three rehabilitated apartment buildings, two 4 stories tall another 6 stories tall.
 Sotomayor Houses (formally Bronxdale Houses); twenty-eight 7-story buildings.
 Bronx River Houses; nine 14-story buildings.
 Bronx River Addition; two buildings, one 6 stories tall another 14 stories tall.
 Clason Point Gardens; forty-five buildings, all 2 stories tall.
 Monroe Houses; twelve buildings, either 8, 14, or 15 stories tall.
 Sack Wern Houses; seven buildings, each 6 stories tall.
 Soundview Houses; thirteen 7-story buildings.

Police and crime
Soundview is one of several neighborhoods in the Southeast Bronx patrolled by the 43rd Precinct of the NYPD, located at 900 Fteley Avenue. The current 43rd Precinct was constructed in Soundview in 1978, and the overall coverage area was reduced significantly with the introduction of the 49th Precinct north of Amtrak's Northeast Corridor right-of-way in the East Bronx. , with a non-fatal assault rate of 100 per 100,000 people, the 43rd Precinct's rate of violent crimes per capita is more than that of the city as a whole. The incarceration rate of 603 per 100,000 people is higher than that of the city as a whole.

The 43rd Precinct has a lower crime rate than in the 1990s, with crimes across all categories having decreased by 63.1% between 1990 and 2022. The precinct reported 6 murders, 48 rapes, 747 robberies, 806 felony assaults, 302 burglaries, 1,039 grand larcenies, and 561 grand larcenies auto in 2022.

Fire safety
Soundview contains a New York City Fire Department (FDNY) fire station, Engine Company 96/Ladder Company 54, at 1689 Story Avenue.

Health
, preterm births and births to teenage mothers are more common in Bronx Community District 9 including Soundview than in other places citywide. There were 106 preterm births per 1,000 live births (compared to 87 per 1,000 citywide), and 26.4 births to teenage mothers per 1,000 live births (compared to 19.3 per 1,000 citywide). The area has a relatively average population of residents who are uninsured. In 2018, this population of uninsured residents was estimated to be 16%, higher than the citywide rate of 14%.

Eighteen percent of residents are smokers, which is higher than the city average of 14% of residents being smokers. 32% of residents are obese, 16% are diabetic, and 34% have high blood pressure—compared to the citywide averages of 24%, 11%, and 28% respectively. In addition, 25% of children are obese, compared to the citywide average of 20%.

Eighty-three percent of residents eat some fruits and vegetables every day, which is less than the city's average of 87%. In 2018, 72% of residents described their health as "good," "very good," or "excellent," lower than the city's average of 78%. For every supermarket in Bronx Community District 9, there are 13 bodegas.

The nearest hospital campuses are Montefiore Medical Center's Westchester Square and West Farms campuses, as well as Bronx-Lebanon Hospital Center's Longwood campus. The nearest large hospital is NYC Health + Hospitals/Jacobi in Morris Park.

Post offices and ZIP Codes
Soundview is located within two ZIP Codes. The area north of Bruckner Expressway/Interstate 278 is in 10472, while the area south of Bruckner Expressway/I-278 is in 10473. The United States Postal Service operates three post offices nearby:
 Clason Point Station – 829 Soundview Avenue
 Cornell Station – 1950 Lafayette Avenue
 Soundview Station – 1687 Gleason Avenue

Education 

Bronx Community District 9 including Soundview generally has a similar rate of college-educated residents to the rest of the Bronx . While 23% of residents age 25 and older have a college education or higher, 30% have less than a high school education and 47% are high school graduates or have some college education. By contrast, 26% of Bronx residents and 43% of city residents have a college education or higher. The percentage of students excelling in math rose from 23% in 2000 to 44% in 2011, and reading achievement increased from 27% to 30% during the same time period.

The rate of elementary school student absenteeism is higher than the rest of New York City. 28% of elementary school students missed twenty or more days per school year, more than the citywide average of 20%. Additionally, 69% of high school students graduate on time, lower than the citywide average of 75%.

Schools
The following public schools are located in Soundview:

Public:
 P.S. 47 John Randolph (1794 E 172nd St)
 P.S. 93 Albert G Oliver (1535 Story Ave)
 P.S. 69 Journey Prep School (560 Theriot Ave)
 P.S. 100 Isaac Clason (800 Taylor Ave)
 P.S. 107 (1695 Seward Ave) Boys Prep Elementary Charter School  
 Bronx Arena High School (1440 Story Ave)
 Felisa Rincon De Gautier Institute For Law And Pub High School (1440 Story Ave)
 Bronx Public School 152 (1007 Evergreen Ave)
 Junior High School 123 James M Kiernan (1025 Morrison Ave)
 Junior High School 131 Albert Einstein (885 Bolton Ave)
 Soundview Academy For Culture And Scholarship (885 Bolton Ave)
 Metropolitan Lighthouse Charter School

There is also one parochial school:
 Holy Cross Elementary School

Libraries
The New York Public Library (NYPL) operates three branches near Soundview.
 The Clason's Point branch is located at 1215 Morrison Avenue. The branch opened in 1952 and moved to its current location in 1971.
 The Parkchester branch is located at 1985 Westchester Avenue. The branch opened in 1942 within the Parkchester development and moved to its current two-story structure in 1985.
 The Soundview branch is located at 660 Soundview Avenue. The branch opened at this location in 1973.

Transportation

 Elder Avenue
 Morrison Avenue–Soundview
 St. Lawrence Avenue

The following MTA Regional Bus Operations bus routes serve Soundview:
 : to Westchester Square or Third Avenue-149th Street (via Westchester Avenue)
 : to Westchester Square or Simpson Street (via Westchester Avenue and Metropolitan Oval)
 : to Co-op City and Bay Plaza Shopping Center or Simpson Street (via Story Avenue)
 Bx11: to George Washington Bridge Bus Terminal (via 170th Street, Claremont Parkway, 174th Street)
 : to Simpson Street or Clason Point (via Rosedale Avenue)
 : to Pugsley–Randall Avenues or George Washington Bridge Bus Terminal (via Tremont Avenue and White Plains Road)
 : to Wakefield–241st Street or Clason Point (via White Plains Rd)

NYC Ferry's Soundview route started serving Soundview on August 15, 2018.

Notable residents

 Ahmed Best (born 1973), voice of Jar Jar Binks in Star Wars movies.
 Jules Feiffer (born 1929), cartoonist, playwright, and author, grew up on Stratford Avenue
 Marcus Jansen (born 1968), painter who resided in the Lafayette Boynton Apartments
 Yaphet Kotto (1939–2021), actor who grew up in Soundview Houses.
 KRS-One (born 1965), rapper, lyricist and occasional producer who resided in a group home on Lacombe Avenue near the Soundview Houses.
 John Orozco (born 1992), Olympic gymnast.
 Sonia Sotomayor (born 1954), U.S. Supreme Court Justice since 2009, grew up in the Bronxdale Houses.
 Phil Spector (1939–2021), producer, songwriter, and originator of the "Wall of Sound" was born and raised in Soundview Houses.
 Kemba Walker (born 1990), point guard for the New York Knicks, grew up at the Sack Wern Houses.
 Sylvia Woods (1926–2012), owner of the Harlem establishment Sylvia's Restaurant, had residences in the Soundview-Bruckner neighborhood.
 The Jazzy Five MCs are the first rappers from the Soundview Houses.
 DJ Jazzy Jay is from Bronx River Houses.
 Senior Management Executive of Roc Nation Shawn "Pecas" Costner lived in Soundview.
 Several members of the Hip Hop group Money Boss Players, including Lord Tariq—also known for his work as part of the duo Lord Tariq and Peter Gunz—hail from the Soundview Houses.
 Treston Irby from R&B quintet Hi-Five is from Stevenson Commons.
 Serial killer David Berkowitz, also known as Son of Sam, lived in the neighborhood as a child.
 Ruff Ryders recording artist Drag-On and hip hop DJ Disco King Mario are from the Bronxdale Houses.
 Afrika Bambaataa is from Bronx River Houses, which is considered the foundation of hip hop's Zulu Nation. He was also a member of the Black Spades which began in the Bronxdale Houses.
 The late Big Pun grew up on Commonwealth Avenue in Soundview.
 Professional bodybuilder and exotic dancer Rodney St. Cloud grew up in Soundview and attended P.S. 100 and Adlai E. Stevenson High School.
 Alicia Keys's former manager and music industry professional Jeff Robinson grew up in Bronxdale Houses.
 Sex Money Murder street gang founder Peter Rollock, or Pistol Pete is from Soundview Houses.
 Four time New York Golden Gloves champion and former heavyweight boxer Mitch "Blood" Green lived in Bronxdale Houses, and was a member of the Black Spades.
 Former welterweight boxing champion Aaron Davis is from Bronxdale Houses.
 Uptown Records founder and former CEO of Motown Andre Harrell is from Bronxdale Houses.
 Former NBA player Ed Pinckney is from Monroe Houses.
 Wesley Snipes lived in Soundview, attending I.S. 131.
 Girl group The Chiffons, known for their 1963 hit He's So Fine, are from Bronx River Houses.
 Author Susan J. Elliott, J.D., M.Ed. grew up on Soundview and Banyer Place and attended Holy Cross School.
 The original members of the Latin Rock band Seguida are from Soundview.
 Record producer and songwriter, Ron Rogers, composer of the 1979 disco hit Deputy of Love and other dance records is from Soundview.
August Darnell, member of disco band Dr. Buzzard's Original Savannah Band and lead singer of Kid Creole and the Coconuts is from Soundview.

See also
 Clason Point, Bronx

References

External links

 http://www.bronxmall.com/commboards/cd9.html
 Web page at NYC.gov - Official site of the Community Board

 
Neighborhoods in the Bronx